Sylvester Clark Smith (August 26, 1858 – January 26, 1913) was an American lawyer and politician who served four terms as a U.S. Representative from California from 1905 to 1913.

Biography 
Born near Mount Pleasant, Iowa, Smith attended the district schools and Howe's Academy at Mount Pleasant.
He taught school in Winfield, Iowa.
He moved to California in 1879 and engaged in agricultural pursuits.
He taught school in Colusa and Kern Counties in 1883.
He studied law.

He was admitted to the bar in 1885 and commenced practice in Bakersfield, California.
Edited the Kern County Echo.
He resumed the practice of law.
He served as member of the State senate 1894–1902.
He was an unsuccessful candidate for election in 1902 to the Fifty-eighth Congress.

Congress 
Smith was elected as a Republican to the Fifty-ninth and to the three succeeding Congresses and served from March 4, 1905, until his death in Los Angeles, California, January 26, 1913.

He was interred in Union Cemetery.

See also
List of United States Congress members who died in office (1900–49)

References

 Sylvester C. Smith, late a representative from California, Memorial addresses delivered in the House of Representatives and Senate frontispiece 1914

External links
Join California Sylvester C. Smith

1858 births
1913 deaths
People from Mount Pleasant, Iowa
Republican Party California state senators
Republican Party members of the United States House of Representatives from California
19th-century American politicians
20th-century American politicians